The Shenzhen–Hong Kong high-speed train are high-speed train services operating between Shenzhen and Hong Kong.

Although categorized as G-series trains, of which the top-speed is commonly 300-350 km/h, the top-speed for trains on this service is 200 km/h.

History 
The high-speed train services between Shenzhen and Hong Kong was commenced on 23 September 2018 when the Hong Kong section of the Guangzhou–Shenzhen–Hong Kong XRL was opened. 

The G5711 train towards  and G5736 train towards  are the trains on the debut service.

Operations 
The G5701-5714 (Shenzhen North↔West Kowloon) and G5801-5804 (Futian↔West Kowloon) trains are operated by CR Guangzhou, while others trains are operated by MTR.

Other services 
Some other long-haul train services also provide high-speed train connections between Shenzhen and Hong Kong.
 The G79/80 Beijing–Hong Kong high-speed train 
 The G99/100 Shanghai–Hong Kong high-speed train 
 The G6113/6114 Changsha–Hong Kong high-speed train 
 The G314/1 and G312/3 Kunming–Hong Kong high-speed train 
 Shantou–Hong Kong high-speed train 
 Xiamen–Hong Kong high-speed train 
 The G3001/3002 Fuzhou–Hong Kong high-speed train

Rolling stocks 
The trains operated by CR Guangzhou often use CRH1A-A or CR400AF-A EMUs, and the MTR trains are operated with MTR CRH380A (Vibrant Express) EMUs. The formations for the trains on the service are shown below.

CRH1A-A

CR400AF-A 
The 16-car CR400AF-A trains are the only type on this service to offer business seats.

Vibrant Express 

The Vibrant Express of MTR are operated by 8-car trainsets with first and second class seats only. A total of 68 first class seats are available in the first and last cars in 2+2 formation. The middle cars offer 511 second class seats in 3+2 formation, with wheelchair spaces are provided on the seventh car.

References 

China Railway passenger services
Passenger rail transport in China
Railway services introduced in 2018